"Sweet Violets" is an American song that contains classic example of a "censored rhyme", where the expected rhyme of each couplet is replaced with an unexpected word which segues into the next couplet or chorus.  For example, the first couplets go:
There once was a farmer who took a young miss
In back of the barn where he gave her a...
Lecture on horses and chickens and eggs
And told her that she had such beautiful...
Manners that suited a girl [etc.]

The chorus is taken nearly verbatim from the song "Sweet Violets" by Joseph Emmet, from his 1882 play Fritz Among the Gypsies:
Sweet violets, sweeter than the roses
Covered all over from head to toe
Covered all over with sweet violets.

The song was recorded by Dinah Shore with Henri René's Orchestra & Chorus in Hollywood on May 20, 1951. The song was released by RCA Victor Records as catalog number 20-4174A (78 rpm record), 47-4174A (single) (in USA), by EMI on the His Master's Voice label as catalog number B 10115 in the UK, and EA 3997 in Australia, also on the His Master's Voice label. The Dinah Shore version was arranged by Cy Coben and Charles Grean. It reached number 3 on the Billboard chart.

It has also been recorded  by  Mitch Miller and the Gang, Jane Turzy, and Judy Lynn.

The song (in all its versions, combined) reached number one on the Cash Box best-seller chart.

Numerous folk versions exist in which the implied lyrics are more risqué.

Copyright
Copyright 1951 by Edwin H. Morris & Company, Inc. by Cy Coben and Charles Grean

References

American folk songs
1882 songs
1951 singles
Songs about plants
Number-one singles in the United States